Guido Fulst (born 7 June 1970) is a former German racing cyclist, who competed for the SG Dynamo Wernigerode, SC Dynamo Berlin / Sportvereinigung (SV) Dynamo. He won many titles during his career. He won two gold medals and a bronze at the Olympic Games.

References

External links 

1970 births
Living people
People from Wernigerode
German male cyclists
Cyclists at the 1992 Summer Olympics
Cyclists at the 1996 Summer Olympics
Cyclists at the 2000 Summer Olympics
Cyclists at the 2004 Summer Olympics
Olympic cyclists of Germany
Olympic gold medalists for Germany
Olympic bronze medalists for Germany
Olympic medalists in cycling
Cyclists from Saxony-Anhalt
UCI Track Cycling World Champions (men)
Medalists at the 1992 Summer Olympics
Medalists at the 2000 Summer Olympics
Medalists at the 2004 Summer Olympics
German track cyclists
20th-century German people
21st-century German people